Cumberland High School is a co-educational comprehensive secondary school (high school) located in the north-western metropolitan Western Sydney region of New South Wales, Australia.

History 
Cumberland High School opened in January 1962 with an initial intake of 270 students in First Form (now known as Year 7). This student cohort commenced high school under the Wyndham Scheme, which extended New South Wales high school from five to six years and placed a greater emphasis on science and mathematics.

The foundation headmaster was George Heery (1962–1965), who was responsible for the selection of the original school colours (brown, green and white), the school motto "Finis Coronat Opus", ("the end crowns the work") and the Cumberland school song.

In addition to students from Carlingford, early students were drawn from as far afield as Pennant Hills, West Pennant Hills, and Beecroft to the north; from Epping, Ermington and Rydalmere to the east; from Dundas, Dundas Valley and Telopea to the south; and North Parramatta to the south-west. Subsequently, the student catchment area contracted with the establishment of nearby high schools, particularly Castle Hill High School (1963), Pennant Hills High School (1966), Carlingford High School (1968), and Muirfield High School (1976).

In 2008, four Cumberland students took part in the Beijing Olympics, as members of the Olympic Games Orchestra.

Campus 
Cumberland High is located at 183 Pennant Hills Road, Carlingford, New South Wales.

The site was originally part of portions 100, 101 in the Parish of Field of Mars, County of Cumberland. Portion 101 was granted to William Evans by Lieutenant Governor Francis Grose on 11 April 1794. The grant is described in the Grant Register as "laying and situated at The Ponds adjoining Carver's Farm". Portion 100 was granted to William Butts on 19 November 1794, and described in the Grant Register as "laying and situated in the district of The Ponds".

The site is separated with blocks lettered with a certain letter.

The current principal for Cumberland is Mechel Pikoulas.

Student profile 
The school has a traditional format and organization. Its administration places emphasis on discipline and requires students to wear a school uniform. The school is populated with 35% of students coming from outside the school's designated local area. Students come from families that are very diverse, socially and economically. In recent years, there has been an increase in enrolment by non-English speaking students (56% in 2005) with 35% of all students receiving English as a second language (ESL) program support. In 2005, 37 international students were enrolled, out of a total of 769.

Notable teachers 
 Sándor Rozsnyói, (Alex Rozsnyoi) World record holder, 3000 metre steeplechase (athletics). Silver medal, 3000 metre steeplechase, 1956 Summer Olympics.  Gold medal, 3000 metre steeplechase, 1954 European Championships.
 Michael Naray, attended the 2008 Olympics in Beijing, participating in archery. He played for Australia.

Notable alumni 
 Ray Price, Parramatta, NSW and Australian representative in Rugby Union and Rugby League.
 Alex Hawke MP, Member of the House of Representatives for Mitchell (2007–present)
 Jeni Klugman, B.Ec., LL.B., (Sydney), 1988 NSW Rhodes Scholar. First New South Wales female Rhodes Scholar.
 Peter Gilmore (chef), award winning Chef at Quay Sydney, rated in the world's Top 50 Restaurant.
 Mark Jankovics, Marconi and Australian representative in soccer 1976-83.
 James Treble, building and interior designer.

References

External links 
 

Public high schools in Sydney